1976 Bogra mutiny was a mutiny of Bangladesh Army soldiers stationed in Bogra Cantonment.

Background 
Sheikh Mujibur Rahman was the founding father of Bangladesh and the first Prime Minister of the country after its independence of Pakistan in 1971.

Sheikh Mujibur Rahman and most of his family were killed in the 15 August 1975 Bangladeshi coup d'état by officers and soldiers of Bangladesh Army. Khondker Moshtaq Ahmed became president of Bangladesh and praised the killers of Sheikh Mujibur Rahman. The regiments involved in the coup were divided and dispersed to different cantonments around Bangladesh. Officers invovled in the coup and killing were given posts in diplomatic missions of Bangladesh.

The Bengal Lancers were directly involved in the coup and killing of Sheikh Mujibur Rahman. They were posted to Bogra Cantonment and their officers were sent into diplomatic posting outside of Bangladesh. Major General Ziaur Rahman, chief of Bangladesh Army, had difficulty moving the Bengal Lancers to Bogra but was forced after Air Vice Marshall Muhammad Ghulam Tawab, Chief of Bangladesh Air Force, threatened to use Air Force aircraft against the Bengal Lancers.

Events 
Air Vice Marshall Muhammad Ghulam Tawab addressed a rally of Bangladesh Jamaat-e-Islami calling for Bangladesh to be changed from a secular state to an Islamic one. The next month Tawab supports the return of four army officers involved in the assassination of Sheikh Mujibur Rahman and join the Bengal Lancers in Bogra Cantonment.

The led to the 1976 Bogra mutiny under Colonel Syed Faruque Rahman, one of officers Tawab helped returned. It involved soldiers from the 1st Bengal Lancers and 1st Bengal Cavalry. The mutineers wanted the creation of an Islamic state in Bangladesh. The government of Bangladesh responded firmly to the mutiny threatening to completely annihilate the unit. Syed Faruque Rahman surrenders on the condition that he will not be tried and be allowed to leave Bangladesh.

After the failed mutiny, Major General Ziaur Rahman retires Tawab, sends the four officers back, and disbands the Bengal Lancers. Major Khandaker Abdur Rashid of the returnee officers involved in the 1975 coup told diplomats of the United States that there would be more violence in army over differences in the army. The 22nd Bengal Regiment mutnitied in the 1977 Bogra mutiny to call for the release of Syed Faruque Rahman.

References 

1976 crimes in Bangladesh
Conflicts in 1976
1976
Murder in Bangladesh
Mutinies
Military history of Bangladesh
History of Bangladesh (1971–present)
1970s in Dhaka
1976 in military history
Military coups in Bangladesh
April 1976 events in Asia
1970s coups d'état and coup attempts
Bogura District